Djibouti competed at the 2012 Summer Olympics in London, from July 27 to August 12, 2012. This was the nation's seventh appearance at the Olympics.

Five athletes were selected to the team, competing in athletics, judo, swimming, and table tennis. This was the first Olympics that Djibouti participated in swimming and table tennis. Track runner Zourah Ali was the nation's flag bearer at the opening ceremonies, while table tennis player Yasmin Farah was the flag bearer for the closing ceremonies. Djibouti failed to win an Olympic medal at these Games, and have not won a medal since the 1988 Summer Olympics in Seoul.

Background 

Djibouti debuted at the 1984 Olympic Games, fielding three marathon runners. Djibouti's one and only medal prior to these Games was a bronze awarded to Hussein Ahmed Salah for the marathon in at the 1988 Seoul Olympic Games. The first female athlete for Djibouti, Roda Ali Wais, debuted at the 2000 Sydney Olympic Games.

Athletics

Djibouti had two athletes qualify for athletics at this Olympics, one male and one female. Mumin Gala qualified for the 5000 metre run and Zourah Ali qualified for the 400 metre run.

Djibouti's National Olympic Committee (NOC) selected two athletes that met the qualification standards. A NOC can to enter up to three qualified athletes in each individual event as long as each athlete met the "A" standard, or one athlete per event if they met the "B" standard. Mumin was qualified via the A standard. If no athletes meet the qualification standard, a country is permitted to enter their best male and best female athlete in one event each, which is how Zourah was qualified.

Gala finished the first heat with a time of 13:21.21, finishing 10th. Although the first five from each heat move on to the finals, the next five fastest times are also qualified, and Gala was fifth on that list. Gala was close to his personal record of 13:17.77 in the first heat, but he finished the final with a time of 13:50.26 and placed 13th overall, out of a field of 43 athletes.

Zourah competed in the 400 metre race, which she completed in 1:05.37 minutes. She did not place high enough in her heat to be qualified for the semifinals, as she finished in 44th place and with the second slowest time in that race.

Men

Women

Judo

Djibouti had 1 judoka invited, who competed in the second round after a first round bye. She lost this match to Căprioriu and finished 9th overall in the tournament.

Swimming

Osman gained a universality placement from the FINA, with a time of 27.69 seconds. At the Olympics, Osman placed first in his heat with a time of 27.25 seconds. He was 4.98 seconds away from qualifying for the next round, and finished 49th overall.

Men

Table tennis

Yasmin Farah competed in women's singles at the age of 18. The event was held at ExCeL London. The top thirty-two seeds received byes, since Yasmin was seeded 70th her match was in the preliminary round, which she lost in four rounds, scoring 0, 2, 2, and 4 in the matches respectively.

See also
 Djibouti at the 2012 Summer Paralympics

References

External links
 
 

Nations at the 2012 Summer Olympics
2012
Olymp